Monica Louise Horan (born January 29, 1963) is an American actress best known for her role as Amy MacDougall-Barone on the television sitcom Everybody Loves Raymond.

Life and career
Horan was born in Darby, Pennsylvania, the daughter of Selma (née Spencer), a clerk, and Robert J. Horan, a courthouse officer. She graduated from Archbishop Prendergast Catholic High School for Girls in Drexel Hill, Pennsylvania in 1980. She attended Hofstra University in Hempstead, New York, graduating with a degree in Theater Performance in 1984. She then moved to New York City where she performed in off-off Broadway theatre while working as a telephone sales agent for Telecharge. She met her future husband, Philip Rosenthal, who served as executive producer of Everybody Loves Raymond, while attending Hofstra, and she converted to Judaism before their marriage in 1990.

Horan is probably best known for her appearance in the part of Amy McDougall (later Barone), Robert Barone's off-on again girlfriend, then wife, on the CBS-TV sitcom series Everybody Loves Raymond. Horan appeared in 66 episodes of the series, making her first appearance in the episode titled "Who's Handsome?" (Season 1, episode #14). She currently lives in Los Angeles with her husband and their two children. Horan has guest-starred on the Hot in Cleveland series (Season 2) playing an Amish woman, and in 2017 was reunited with her Everybody Loves Raymond co-star Patricia Heaton when she guest-starred on a Season 8 episode of The Middle. She featured in her husband's travel/food show, Somebody Feed Phil.

Her maternal grandfather was Jewish. Horan is a Democrat.

Filmography

Film

Television

Awards and nominations

References

External links

1963 births
Living people
People from Darby, Pennsylvania
American television actresses
Hofstra University alumni
Jewish American actresses
Converts to Judaism
Actresses from Pennsylvania
Pennsylvania Democrats
California Democrats
21st-century American Jews
21st-century American women